This is a complete list of the parks and gardens in the English county of Essex that are listed on the Register of Historic Parks and Gardens.

Hylands Park
(1000197
Grade II*
Hatfield Priory
(1000206
Grade II
New Hall, Boreham
(1000207
Grade II
Colchester Castle Park
(1000208
Grade II
Layer Marney Tower
(1000209
Grade II
St Osyth's Priory
(1000237
Grade II
Bridge End Gardens
(1000238
Grade II*
Riffhams
(1000239
Grade II
Spains Hall
(1000240
Grade II*
Langleys
(1000241
Grade II
Blake Hall
(1000311
Grade II
Audley End
(1000312
Grade I
Gosfield Hall
(1000313
Grade II
Thorndon Hall
(1000314
Grade II*
Hill Hall
(1000315
Grade II
Faulkbourne Hall
(1000341
Grade II
Boreham House
(1000354
Grade II
Wivenhoe Park
(1000371
Grade II
Copped Hall
(1000384
Grade II*
Saling Hall
(1000387
Grade II
Braxted Park
(1000455
Grade II*
Thorpe Hall
(1000521
Grade II
Belchamp Hall
(1000737
Grade II
Danbury Park
(1000739
Grade II
Down Hall
(1000740
Grade II
The Maze, saffron walden
(1000741
Grade II
Quendon Hall
(1000742
Grade II
Saling Grove
(1000743
Grade II
Shortgrove Hall
(1000744
Grade II
Terling Place
(1000745
Grade II
Warley Place
(1000746
Grade II
Weald Park
(1000747
Grade II
The House, Marsh Lane
(1001299
Grade II
Easton Lodge
(1001484
Grade II
Coopersale House
(1001485
Grade II
Severalls Hospital
(1001599
Grade II
Clacton seafront gardens
(1001626

Briggens House

(1001705
Grade II

Listed parks and gardens in Essex
Lists of listed buildings in Essex